Jeziora may refer to:

Jeziora, Greater Poland Voivodeship (west-central Poland)
Jeziora, Kuyavian-Pomeranian Voivodeship (north-central Poland)
Jeziora, Masovian Voivodeship (east-central Poland)